Stare Czaple  (Kashubian Stôré Czaple) is a village in the administrative district of Gmina Stężyca, within Kartuzy County, Pomeranian Voivodeship, in northern Poland.

For details of the history of the region, see History of Pomerania.

The village has a population of 105.

Notable residents
 Adalbert Brunke (1912–2013), Bishop of the Evangelical Lutheran Church in Southern Africa

References

Stare Czaple